Larry Laoretti (born July 11, 1939) is an American golfer.

Laoretti was born in Mahopac, New York. After leaving the U.S. Navy he worked as a club professional, winning no tournaments of note until he was past 50. His best finish in a major was T-49 at the 1966 PGA Championship.

In 1989, Laoretti won both the regular and senior Florida PGA championships, and he joined the Senior PGA Tour the following season. In 1992, he won the U.S. Senior Open.  His trademark was playing, including during his swing, with a lit cigar in his mouth.

Professional wins (1)

Senior PGA Tour wins (1)

Senior major championships

Wins (1)

U.S. national team appearances
Professional
Wendy's 3-Tour Challenge (representing Senior PGA Tour): 1992

References

External links

American male golfers
PGA Tour Champions golfers
Winners of senior major golf championships
Golfers from New York (state)
People from Brevard County, Florida
People from Jupiter, Florida
People from Mahopac, New York
People from Titusville, Florida
1939 births
Living people